Hiram J. Bertoch (born May 5, 1977) is an American author, best known for writing Apollo Salvatoir: Shā-Shǔ The Dragon, a national bestseller, The Mountain Christians, which was a regional bestseller, and An Otter's Guidebook To Being Obnoxiously Happy.

Biography 
Bertoch began writing in 1998, mostly for textbook companies. His early works were mainly educational articles and textbook entries. He has a bachelor's degree in Earth Science, and a master's degree in Biology.

In the early 2000s Bertoch wrote a series of educational storybooks for The KidsKnowIt Network.  These were later translated into Spanish and Portuguese by the Jesuit arm of The Catholic Church and distributed to millions of school children throughout São Paulo, Brazil and Central America.

In 2012 Bertoch wrote his first full novel titled The Mountain Christians, which sold approximately 15,000 copies mainly in Utah, Idaho, Wyoming, and pockets of California. The book reached regional bestseller status in the Spring of 2013, and gained Bertoch a loyal following in the United States.

During the pandemic of 2019, Bertoch wrote his first national bestseller, which was titled Apollo Salvatoir: Shā-Shǔ The Dragon. In addition to these two best sellers, Bertoch has written a number of storybooks, and novellas that have sold to smaller audiences.

Bertoch lives with his wife and seven children in Hunter, Utah.

Published works

Non-fiction 
 Numerous textbooks  (1998-2015) 
 An Otter's Guidebook To Being Obnoxiously Happy (2016)

Series 
 The Adventures of Super Nolan
 Space (2002)
 Oceans (2002)
 Jungles (2002)
 Poles (2003)
 Moons (2003)
 Planets (2004)
 Deserts (2004)
 Plants (2004)
 Dinosaurs (2005)
 The Mountain Christians
 For The Strength of The Hills (2012)
 Master The Tempest Is Raging (2018) 
 Apollo Salvatoir
 Apollo Salvatoir: Shā-Shǔ The Dragon  (2022)

Children's books 
 Godfather Drosselmeyer (2016)
 Malloroni And Cheese: And Other Stories (2017)

References

External links 
 Publisher Finny Wiggen Media
 Publisher Pearson
 Hiram J. Bertoch Official Website
 Charleston Gazette-Mail

1977 births
21st-century American writers
Living people
Western Governors University alumni